Hopeanol is a highly cytotoxic resveratrol-derivative with the molecular formula C29H20O9 which has been isolated from the bark of the tree Hopea exalata.

References

Further reading 

 
 
 

Hopeanol
Methyl esters